A card enclosure is a container for smart cards, credit cards, debit cards, telephone cards, visiting cards, business cards and other cards of similar size. Most cards have dimensions that follow the ID-1 format of the ISO/IEC 7810 standard which specify the physical dimensions for cards to be 85.60 × 53.98 mm. The enclosures can be made of metal, leather, or plastic and come in various colors and designs. Sometimes having a laser engraved design for aesthetic purposes.

There are shaped CDs that are business card sized that also fit.

If made of aluminum, it may provide RFID shielding for proximity cards.

See also 
Wallet
Money clip

Containers
Debit cards
Fashion accessories
Smart cards
Credit card terminology